Idea Bank Spółka Akcyjna (currently Bank Polska Kasa Opieki Spółka Akcyjna) (formerly GMAC Bank Polska SA) was a bank in Poland, which began operations in 1991 and was taken over by Bank Pekao SA on 3 January 2021 as a part of compulsory restructuring engineered by Poland's Bank Guarantee Fund. The bank's domain was the financial service of small business entities; micro, small and medium enterprises. Idea Bank was controlled by Getin Holding and Getin Noble Bank. Main shareholder was a Polish billionaire Leszek Czarnecki.

History
The operational activities were undertaken by the company in 1991 and are continued to this day. The bank operated as Polbank SA and later as Opel Bank SA. Pursuant to the order of 26 July 2001, the name was changed to GMAC Bank Polska SA (the notarial deed of the amendment was made on May 24, 2001). Then, by virtue of the order of 13 October 2010, the name was changed to Idea Bank SA.

On 31 December 2020, Idea Bank SA was a subject to compulsory restructuring engineered by Poland's Bank Guarantee Fund and has been taken over by Bank Polska Kasa Opieki SA on 3 January 2021.

International operations 

 Idea Bank
Idea Bank (Russia) 2011—2015
 Idea Bank (Belarus)
 Idea Bank (Ukraine) — in December 2019, Dragon Capital Investments Limited entered into an agreement to acquire 100% of the shares of Ukraine's Idea Bank.
 Idea Bank (Romania) 2013—2021

References

External links

Banks of Poland
Polish brands
Banks established in 2003
Companies based in Wrocław